Quiet City may refer to:

 Quiet City (play), a 1939 drama by Irwin Shaw
 Quiet City (music), a 1941 composition by Aaron Copland extracted from his incidental music written for the Shaw play
 Quiet City (film), a 2007 film by Aaron Katz
 Quiet City, a video game developed by Increpare Games